Van Ronk is an album by folk music artist Dave Van Ronk, released in 1971.

History
Van Ronk  features some of his most elaborate recordings with many backing musicians. It includes English language versions of songs by non-English speaking composers (Bertold Brecht and Jacques Brel).

Another release titled Van Ronk was issued as a double LP in 1972 by Fantasy Records by pairing Dave Van Ronk, Folksinger and Inside Dave Van Ronk. That collection was later released on CD as Inside Dave Van Ronk.

Reception

Village Voice critic Robert Christgau wrote of Van Ronk: "He shoots his shot at big-label production here, and now and then the orchestration (not to mention the material) turns surprisingly schmaltzy, but for the most part this shouted melee of song collection is a riot."

Track listing

Side one
"Bird on the Wire" (Leonard Cohen) – 3:55
"Fox's Minstrel Show" (Michael Small) – 3:05
"Port of Amsterdam" (Jacques Brel, Eric Blau, Mort Shuman) – 3:25
"Fat Old John" (Peter Stampfel) – 1:06
"Urge for Going" (Joni Mitchell) – 4:37

Side two
"Random Canyon" (Peter Stampfel) – 2:05
"I Think It's Going to Rain Today" (Randy Newman) – 3:50
"Gaslight Rag" (Dave Van Ronk) – 2:55
"Honey Hair" (Van Ronk) – 3:15
"Legend of the Dead Soldier" (Bertolt Brecht, Eric Bentley) – 4:05
"Ac-Cent-Tchu-Ate the Positive" (Johnny Mercer, Harold Arlen) – 2:30

Personnel
Dave Van Ronk – vocals, guitar

Production notes
All Songs Arranged by Dave Woods except "Gaslight Rag" by Dave Van Ronk
Produced by Dave Woods
Engineered by Steve Katz
Cover Art by Anne Friedman
Morale by Joanne Grace
Manager – Ron Shelley
Spiritual – John Jameson
Polydor: Karen Austin, Jon Sagen

References

1971 albums
Dave Van Ronk albums
Polydor Records albums